Kildonan-River East is a provincial electoral district in the Canadian province of Manitoba that first came into effect for the 2019 Manitoba general election. It elected one member to the Legislative Assembly of Manitoba.

The riding was created by the 2018 provincial redistribution out of parts of Kildonan, River East, and a small part of St. Johns.

The riding contains the Winnipeg neighbourhoods of Riverbend, Rivergrove, Kildonan Drive, Valhalla and River East.

Election results

2019 general election

References

Manitoba provincial electoral districts
Kildonan, Winnipeg